Dibiyaso  Bainapi is a Papuan language of Western Province, Papua New Guinea (Bamustu, Makapa, and Pikiwa villages).

Classification
It is sometimes classified with the Bosavi languages. Søren Wichmann (2013) tentatively considers it to be a separate, independent group. Pawley and Hammarström (2018) note that similarities between Bosavi and Dibiyaso are likely due to loanwords, therefore leaving Dibiyaso as unclassified.

There is 19% lexical cognacy with Turumsa, suggesting contact or perhaps even a genetic relationship Doso–Turumsa language.

Distribution
Dibiyaso is spoken in Bamustu, Makapa, and Pikiwa villages of Gogodala Rural LLG, Western Province, Papua New Guinea.

Vocabulary
The following basic vocabulary words are from Franklin and Voorhoeve (1973), Reesink (1976), and Shaw (1986), as cited in the Trans-New Guinea database:

References

External links
TransNewGuinea.org database

Unclassified languages of New Guinea
Papuan Plateau languages
Languages of Western Province (Papua New Guinea)